The 2004 MLS Expansion Draft was held on November 19, 2004 and consisted of 10 rounds. The two new teams, Chivas USA and Real Salt Lake, drafted players from the other 10 Major League Soccer teams.

Existing MLS teams were allowed to protect 12 players on their senior roster, and players on the developmental roster were exempt from the draft. Teams were allowed to leave no more than one Senior International player unprotected. After each player was selected, his team was allowed to remove one exposed player from their list. Teams were not able to lose more than three players.

Expansion Draft

Team-by-Team breakdown

Chicago Fire

Withdrew Evan Whitfield upon selection of Andy Williams (2)
Withdrew Scott Buete upon selection of Orlando Perez (3)
Reached maximum upon selection of D.J. Countess (4)

Colorado Rapids

Withdrew Seth Trembly upon selection of Antonio de la Torre (9)
Withdrew Scott Vallow upon selection of Jeff Stewart (19)

Columbus Crew

Withdrew David Testo upon selection of Nelson Akwari (10)
Draft ended upon selection of Erick Scott (20)

D.C. United

Withdrew Ryan Nelsen upon selection of Ezra Hendrickson (5)
Withdrew Troy Perkins upon selection of Thiago Martins (17)
Reached maximum upon selection of Kevin Ara (18)

F.C. Dallas

Withdrew Philip Salyer upon selection of Matt Behncke (14)

Kansas City Wizards

Withdrew Alex Zotinca upon selection of Francisco Gomez (7)
Withdrew Igor Simutenkov upon selection of Matt Taylor (11)

Los Angeles Galaxy

Withdrew Paul Broome upon selection of Arturo Torres (1)

MetroStars

Withdrew Zach Wells upon selection of Pablo Brenes (6)
Withdrew Jonny Walker upon selection of Craig Ziadie (13)

New England Revolution

Withdrew Joe Franchino upon selection of Brian Kamler (8)
Withdrew Carlos Llamosa upon selection of Rusty Pierce (16)

San Jose Earthquakes

Withdrew Jon Conway upon selection of Chris Brown (12)
Withdrew Wes Hart upon selection of Jamil Walker (16)

References

Major League Soccer Expansion Draft
Draft
MLS Expansion Draft